The Latin Grammy Award for Best Pop/Rock Song is an award presented annually by the Latin Academy of Recording Arts & Sciences at the Latin Grammy Awards.

The description of the category at the 2020 Latin Grammy Awards states that it "includes the genres of Trap and Dancehall Songs" and states that "a song must contain at least 51% of the lyrics in Spanish or Portuguese and must be a new song." The award is to the songwriter(s), with instrumental recordings, sampling and cover songs not elegible for the category.

The category was first awarded at the 21st Annual Latin Grammy Awards in 2020, with Fito Páez being the inaugural winner for writing his song  "La Canción de las Bestias".

Recipients

2020s

References

External links 

Official website of the Latin Grammy Awards

Rap Hip Hop Song
Songwriting awards